José Carlos Sousa Cardoso (born 10 January 1937) is a Portuguese racing cyclist. He rode in the 1959 Tour de France, finishing in 46th place.

References

1937 births
Living people
Portuguese male cyclists